John Schulze may refer to:

 John Andrew Shulze (1774–1852), sixth Governor of Pennsylvania
 John DuCasse Schulze (1876–1943), American art director
 John Schulze (baseball) (1866–1941), Major League Baseball catcher